Riho Unt (born 15 May 1956 in Kose-Risti) is an Estonian animated film director, scenarist, artist.

In 2001 he was awarded with Order of the White Star, V class.

Filmography

 1986 "Kevadine kärbes" (with Hardi Volmer)
 1993 "Kapsapea"
 1997 "Tagasi Euroopasse"
 2000 "Saamueli internet"
 2005 "Vennad karusüdamed"
 2015 "Isand"

References

Living people
1956 births
Estonian caricaturists
Estonian animated film directors
Estonian screenwriters
Recipients of the Order of the White Star, 5th Class
Estonian Academy of Arts alumni
People from Kose Parish